You Are may refer to:

Songs 
 "You Are" (Aaron Goodvin song), 2018
 "You Are" (Atomic Kitten song), 2001
 "You Are" (Colton Dixon song), 2012
 "You Are" (Jimmy Wayne song), 2004
 "You Are" (Lionel Richie song), 1983
 "You Are", by Arid from All Is Quiet Now
 "You Are", by Built to Spill from Ancient Melodies of the Future
 "You Are", by Charlie Wilson
 "You Are", by Dolly Parton from New Harvest – First Gathering
 "You Are", by Elemeno P from Trouble in Paradise
 "You Are", by Glen Campbell from Still Within the Sound of My Voice
 "You Are", by Got7 from 7 for 7
 "You Are", by Matt Brouwer from Unlearning
 "You Are", by Pearl Jam from Riot Act
 "You Are", by Ruth from Secondhand Dreaming
 "You Are", by Tony Moran featuring Frenchie Davis
 "You Are (Variations)", a work for voices and chamber orchestra by Steve Reich
 "You Are", by Armin van Buuren featuring Sunnery James & Ryan Marciano